KZBS (104.3 FM) is a radio station licensed to Granite, Oklahoma, United States. The station is currently owned by BCVision. and broadcasts a Regional Mexican format.

History
This station was assigned call sign KZBS on April 1, 2008.  Those letters had been assigned during the 1980s to what is now KYIS in Oklahoma City. From 2008 to 2019 the station was an affiliate of The Gospel Station Network.

References

External links

ZBS
Radio stations established in 2008
2008 establishments in Oklahoma